Jinghu North Circuit or Jinghu North Province was one of the circuits during the Song dynasty. Its administrative area corresponds to roughly the modern province of Hunan.

Jinghu North Circuit and Jinghu South Circuit were split from Jinghu Circuit in 998.

References

 
 

 
Circuits of the Song dynasty
998 establishments
10th-century establishments in China